Georgii may refer to:

Given name
Georgii Zantaraia (born 1987), Ukrainian judoka of Georgian origin
Georgii Karpechenko  (1899–1941) Russian and Soviet biologist
Georgii Frederiks (1889–1938), Russian geologist
Georgii Zeliony (1878–1951), Russian physiologist 
Georgii Stackelberg (1851–1913), cavalry general in the Imperial Russian Army
Georgii Nadson (1867–1939), Soviet biologist
Georgii Cherkin (born 1977), Bulgarian pianist
Georgii Yurii Pfeiffer (1872–1946) Ukrainian and Soviet mathematician
Georgii Stenberg (1900–1933) Soviet artist and designer; see Stenberg brothers

Other
Psalterium Georgii, constellation created by Maximilian Hell in 1789
Magnolia georgii, species of plant in the family Magnoliaceae
Rhacophorus georgii, species of frog in the family Rhacophoridae
Tetrapturus georgii, see Roundscale spearfish
Russian battleship Georgii Pobedonosets
Russian submarine K-433 Svyatoy Georgiy Pobedonosets
St George the Conqueror Chapel Mausoleum

See also
Georgi (disambiguation)
Georgy (disambiguation)
Georgiy, given name
Georgie (disambiguation)
George (disambiguation)
Heorhiy (disambiguation)